Boonville Village Historic District is a national historic district located at Boonville in Oneida County, New York. The district includes 74 contributing buildings, two contributing structures, and two contributing sites. It includes a grouping of architecturally significant buildings that front on the triangular intersection created by Main, Post, and East Schuyler streets.  Located within the district are the separately listed Erwin Library and Pratt House and US Post Office-Boonville.

It was listed on the National Register of Historic Places in 1979.

References

Historic districts on the National Register of Historic Places in New York (state)
Historic districts in Oneida County, New York
National Register of Historic Places in Oneida County, New York